Senticaudata is one of the four suborders of the crustacean order Amphipoda (aka scuds, sideswimmers). It includes some 5000 species, which is more than 50% or the currently recognized amphipod diversity.

Senticaudata was split off from the traditional suborder Gammaridea by Lowry & Myers in 2013, as a part of a process of reorganising the higher taxonomy of amphipods. It now also encompasses the previously recognized Caprellidea and Corophiidea. The suborder is defined by a presence of  strong apical setae on the 1st and 2nd uropods.

Senticaudata contains much of the world freshwater amphipod diversity, whereas the majority of its species are still marine. Among the major superfamilies included are the Gammaroidea, Crangonyctoidea, Talitroidea and Corophioidea.

Infraorders and superfamilies
Bogidiellida
Bogidielloidea
Carangoliopsida
Carangoliopsoidea 
Corophiida
Caprelloidea
Aetiopedesoidea 
Isaeoidea 
Microprotopoidea
Neomegamphoidea 
Photoidea  
Rakirooidea 
Aoroidea
Cheluroidea  
Chevalioidea
Corophioidea 
Gammarida
Gammaroidea
Crangonyctoidea
Allocrangonyctoidea
Hadziida
Calliopioidea 
Hadzioidea 
Talitrida
Biancolinoidea 
Caspicoloidea  
Kurioidea 
Talitroidea

References

Amphipoda
Arthropod suborders